The Royal Norwegian Ministry of Local Government and Regional Development is a Norwegian ministry established in 1948. It is responsible for the housing and building, regional and rural policy, municipal and county administration and finances, and the conduct of elections. It is headed by the Minister of Local Government and Regional Development.

Organization
The ministry has 190 employees and is divided into five departments:
 The Department of Local Government
 The Department of Regional Development
 The Housing and Building Department

Political staff
 Minister Magnhild Meltveit Kleppa (Centre Party)
 State Secretary Janne Sjelmo Nordås (Centre Party)
 State Secretary Dag-Henrik Sandbakken (Centre Party)
 Political Adviser Lars Erik Bartnes (Centre Party)

Subsidiaries
 Norwegian State Housing Bank, or Husbanken, issues loans for housing.
 National Office of Building Technology and Administration, or Statens bygningstekniske etat, expertise within building technology.

Ministers

 Ulrik Olsen, 1948–1958
 Andreas Zeier Cappelen, 1958–1963
 Oskar Skogly, 1963
 Bjarne Lyngstad, 1963
 Jens Haugland, 1963–1965
 Helge Seip, 1965–1970
 Helge Rognlien, 1970-1971
 Odvar Nordli, 1971–1972
 Johan Skipnes, 1972–1973
 Leif Jørgen Aune, 1973–1978
 Arne Nilsen, 1978–1979
 Inger Louise Valle, 1979–1980
 Harriet Andreassen, 1980–1981
 Arne Rettedal, 1981–1986
 Leif Haraldseth, 1986–1987
 William Engseth, 1987–1988
 Kjell Borgen, 1988–1989
 Johan J. Jakobsen, 1989–1990
 Kjell Borgen, 1990–1992
 Gunnar Berge, 1992–1996
 Kjell Opseth, 1996–1997
 Ragnhild Haarstad, 1997–1999
 Odd Roger Enoksen, 1999–2000
 Sylvia Brustad, 2000–2001
 Erna Solberg, 2001–2005
 Åslaug Haga, 2005–2007
 Magnhild Meltveit Kleppa, 2007–2009
 Liv Signe Navarsete, 2009–2013
 Jan Tore Sanner, 2013-2018
 Monica Mæland, 2018-2020
 Nikolai Astrup, 2020-2021
 Bjørn Arild Gram, 2021–

References

External links
 Official web site

Local Government and Regional Development
Norway
1948 establishments in Norway
Norway, Local Government and Regional Development
Local government ministries